The Division of Greenway is an Australian electoral division in the state of New South Wales.

Greenway includes the Blacktown City Council in Sydney's west and northwestern suburbs.

Greenway is a relatively diverse electorate, with a large Indian community and smaller immigrant communities of Filipino and Sri Lankan ancestry. According to the 2016 census, only 54.5% of electors were born in Australia, while 11% were born in India.

History

The division was created in 1984 and is named for Francis Greenway, an ex-convict who became a prominent architect in colonial Sydney. For most of its history, Greenway was a safe seat for Labor. However, demographic changes in the areas north of Blacktown, specifically Kellyville Ridge, Stanhope Gardens and Glenwood, resulted in a shift away from Labor at the 2001 election. At the 2004 election this trend continued and the seat was won by the Liberal Party following the retirement of the sitting member, Frank Mossfield and an extensive Liberal campaign. Louise Markus, a Pentecostal social worker and member of Hillsong Church, defeated Ed Husic, a former political adviser and a non-practising Muslim, to take the seat by a small margin of 0.6%. A large informal vote of 11.83%, the highest in the 2004 election, contributed to the closeness of this result, the vast majority indicating a first preference for Louise Markus.

A redistribution of the seat ahead of the 2007 federal election resulted in the Hawkesbury area towns, a strongly conservative area, moving to Greenway from the Division of Macquarie, and the loss of traditional Labor-voting areas such as Blacktown, Dean Park, Lalor Park and Seven Hills as well as the Liberal-leaning areas of Kings Langley and Seven Hills North. This boosted the notional Liberal majority to 11.7%, making it on paper a safe Liberal seat. However, at the 2007 federal election, Markus suffered a 6.9% swing, turning Greenway into a marginal Liberal seat.

The seat was redistributed again in 2009, essentially restoring the pre-2007 boundaries and demographics. Under redistribution, most of the Hawkesbury region, including Richmond and Windsor, were shifted back to Macquarie. In return, it regained the Labor voting suburbs of Blacktown, Toongabbie, Seven Hills and Pendle Hill. Following the redistribution, the seat was notionally Labor held on a margin of 5%. Michelle Rowland duly won the seat for Labor in 2010, and has held the seat since.

The division is a demographically diverse population that includes the working class suburbs of Blacktown, Seven Hills, Lalor Park, Schofields, Riverstone and Toongabbie which are Labor leaning, as well as the high income, Liberal leaning suburbs of Kellyville Ridge, Stanhope Gardens, Glenwood, The Ponds and Kings Langley.

Boundaries

Since 1984, federal electoral division boundaries in Australia have been determined at redistributions by a redistribution committee appointed by the Australian Electoral Commission. Redistributions occur for the boundaries of divisions in a particular state, and they occur every seven years, or sooner if a state's representation entitlement changes or when divisions of a state are malapportioned.

The division is located in the west and north-west suburbs of Sydney, traditionally been north and east portions of the Blacktown district. It currently also includes small portions of the former Holroyd Council, amalgamated into Cumberland City Council; and Parramatta Council areas. Suburbs and towns include Acacia Gardens, Girraween, Glenwood, Kellyville Ridge, Kings Langley, Kings Park, Lalor Park, Parklea, Seven Hills, Stanhope Gardens, and The Ponds; as well as parts of Blacktown, Pendle Hill, Prospect, Quakers Hill, Riverstone, Rouse Hill, Schofields, Toongabbie, and Vineyard.

Members

Election results

References

External links
 Division of Greenway – Australian Electoral Commission

Electoral divisions of Australia
Constituencies established in 1984
1984 establishments in Australia